The Republic of Ireland national football team, as governed by the Football Association of Ireland, has featured many players who were not born in the Republic of Ireland. The first player to be capped after qualifying through his parents' nationality was Shay Brennan, who made his debut in a World Cup qualifier against Spain in 1965.

The majority of these players were born in England, mostly the North West and London due to the large Irish diaspora in those areas. Most famously, in the late 1980s and 1990s the Republic of Ireland manager Jack Charlton sought out players in England and used what became known as the "granny rule", with the stronger pool of talent helping the team to qualify for several tournaments, which had never been achieved prior to Charlton's appointment. There were a few England-born internationals in the squads of that era who had been raised in Ireland and learned to play football at local clubs, not least Paul McGrath and David O'Leary as well as Curtis Fleming and Stephen McPhail.

United Kingdom

England

Northern Ireland
Shane Duffy
Darron Gibson
James McClean
Eunan O'Kane
Marc Wilson
Mark Sykes

Scotland

Owen Coyle
Tommy Coyne
Charlie Gallagher
Ray Houghton
James McCarthy
Aiden McGeady
Bernie Slaven

Wales

Kevin Sheedy

Rest of the world

Germany
Derrick Williams

Nigeria
Chiedozie Ogbene

United States
Joseph Lapira

See also
List of dual Irish international footballers

References

Lists of Republic of Ireland international footballers
Ireland
Association football player non-biographical articles
Irish diaspora
Ireland